Filippo Galli (born 19 May 1963) is an Italian football manager and former player, who played as a defender.

He is mostly remembered for his lengthy and successful spell with A.C. Milan, where he played alongside Baresi, Maldini, Costacurta, and Tassotti, forming a strong defensive line-up under managers Arrigo Sacchi and Fabio Capello, in the teams which were respectively known as The Immortals and The Invincibles; during his 15 seasons with the club, he won five Serie A titles and three UEFA Champions League titles, among other trophies.

Club career
Born in Monza, Galli played for A.C. Milan from 1983 to November 1996, after initially being a member of the club's youth sector. He made his Milan debut in Serie A on 18 September 1983, in a 4–2 home win over Verona. During his 13 seasons with the club, he enjoyed many domestic and international successes under managers Arrigo Sacchi and Fabio Capello, winning five Serie A titles, three European Cups, two Intercontinental Cups, three European Super Cups, and four Italian Super Cups; he also scored 4 goals for the club in 325 appearances: 3 in Serie A, in 217 appearances, and 1 in the Coppa Italia, with his final goal coming against Brescia on 4 September 1991. He was initially an important member of the starting line-up alongside teammates Franco Baresi, Mauro Tassotti, and Paolo Maldini, featuring in what is considered to be one of the greatest defences of all time. He played a key role during Milan's 1987–88 Serie A triumph, as Milan only conceded 12 goals in 30 league games, finishing with the best defence in Italy. However, due to injuries, and the emergence of Alessandro Costacurta in his position, he began to find less space in the starting line-up, and was usually used as a substitute in later years, although he was still able to contribute to important victories with the club, notably helping Milan to keep a clean-sheet with a dominant defensive performance, as they defeated Barcelona 4–0 in the 1994 UEFA Champions League Final.

Before joining the Milan senior side, Galli initially made his professional debut whilst on loan with Pescara during the 1982–83 season. Following his time with Milan, he was sold to Reggiana in 1996, another Serie A team. After two seasons with Reggiana, he moved to Brescia for two seasons, helping the club to Serie A promotion, during the 1999–2000 Serie B season, and subsequently helping the team to avoid relegation and qualify for the 2001 UEFA Intertoto Cup the following season, playing alongside Roberto Baggio, under manager Carlo Mazzone. At the age of 38, he successively spent a season at Watford whilst Gianluca Vialli was the team's manager, scoring once against Walsall.

International career
Galli never played for the Italy senior team, although he was capped for the Italy under-21 side on 7 occasions between 1984 and 1987, and he took part with Italy at the 1984 UEFA European Under-21 Championship, where they reached the semi-final. He was also a member of Italy's squad at the 1984 Summer Olympics, where they managed a fourth-place finish.

Style of play
A composed, consistent, intelligence, tenacious, and tactically versatile player, with excellent technique, distribution, Galli was known for his man-marking ability and defensive awareness; an attentive player, he excelled at reading the game, and was usually used as a centre-back, although he was often called on to fill in at any defensive position, and also played at right-back, and as sweeper on occasion.

Despite his ability, he often struggled with injuries throughout his career, and predominantly served as a back-up in his later career, following the emergence of younger players.

After retirement
Galli retired in 2004, aged 41, after two seasons with minor Serie C2 club Pro Sesto. Following his retirement, he began a coaching career, and he has been responsible for the A.C. Milan youth system for many years. In August 2008, he began working for the first team, and he became Carlo Ancelotti's assistant-coach, alongside his former teammate Tassotti. Following Ancelotti's departure in 2009, he became a technical assistant of then-new head coach Leonardo Araújo. Galli also worked as a pundit on occasion. In September 2012, he began the coaching course in Coverciano.

Honours

Club
Milan
 Serie A Winner (5): 1987–88, 1991–92, 1992–93, 1993–94, 1995–96; Runner-up (2): 1989–90, 1990–91.
 Coppa Italia Runner-up (2): 1984–85, 1989–90.
 Supercoppa Italiana Winner (4): 1988, 1992, 1993, 1994; Runner-up (1): 1996.
 UEFA Champions League Winner (3): 1988–89, 1989–90, 1993–94; Runner-up (2): 1992–93, 1994–95.
 UEFA Super Cup Winner (3): 1989, 1990, 1994; Runner-up (1): 1993.
 Intercontinental Cup Winner (2): 1989, 1990; Runner-up (2): 1993, 1994.

Individual
 A.C. Milan Hall of Fame

legend

References

External links
 
  FIGC
 Player career at FootballPlus
 A.C. Milan Roll of Honour

1963 births
Living people
Sportspeople from Monza
Association football defenders
Italian footballers
Italian football managers
A.C. Milan players
S.S.D. Pro Sesto players
A.C. Reggiana 1919 players
Delfino Pescara 1936 players
Brescia Calcio players
Watford F.C. players
A.C. Milan non-playing staff
Serie A players
Serie B players
Serie C players
Italy under-21 international footballers
Olympic footballers of Italy
Footballers at the 1984 Summer Olympics
Italian expatriate footballers
Expatriate footballers in England
UEFA Champions League winning players
Footballers from Lombardy
People from Brianza
Italian expatriate sportspeople in England